Gymnadenia × chanousiana, common name Chanous' gymnadenia, is a natural hybrid between Gymnadenia conopsea and Nigritella rhellicani (syn. Nigritella cenisia).

Description 
This small-sized cold-growing orchid blooms in the summer.

Distribution and habitat 

References 

 G.I.R.O.S. (2009). Orchidee d'Italia: 1–303. Il Castello srl, Italy
 Foelsche, Gundel; Foelsche, W. Une fleur pour la Chanousia" - Die intragenerischen Hybriden der Gattung Gymnadenia R.Br. – 1999
 The Plant List
 E-Monocot
 Tropicos

chanousiana
Orchids of Europe
Flora of Switzerland
Orchid hybrids
Plants described in 1999